Timothy James Naehring (born February 1, 1967) is an American former Major League Baseball infielder who played for the Boston Red Sox from 1990 to 1997, and who currently works in the front office of the New York Yankees.

Amateur career
Naehring graduated from La Salle High School, and attended Miami University. In 1987, he played collegiate summer baseball with the Cotuit Kettleers of the Cape Cod Baseball League.

Professional career
Naehring was selected by the Red Sox in the 8th round of the 1988 amateur draft. He made his major league debut on July 15, 1990 against the Kansas City Royals.

In his years as a starter, Naehring was a fine-fielding third baseman and solid all-around offensive player. He hit .307 with 10 HR and 57 RBI for the AL East Champion Red Sox in 1995. The following season, he hit .288 and set career highs with 17 HR and 65 RBI. In his final campaign in 1997, Naehring was on his way to having his finest season, as he batted .286 with 9 HR and 40 RBI through just 70 games, but a shoulder injury forced him to miss more than half the games that year. He played his final game on June 23, 1997, against the Toronto Blue Jays. Naehring homered in his second to last at bat.

Post playing career
After retiring, Naehring was hired as player development director by the  Cincinnati Reds.  He later was promoted to minor league field coordinator replacing Bob Miscik, who was dismissed in February 2006 by the club. In September , Cincinnati fired Naehring and assistant director of player development Grant Griesser as well as several minor league instructors, coaches and managers as part of a major overhaul of their minor league system.  Naehring was hired by the New York Yankees as a scout in December 2007.  He became the Vice President of Baseball Operations in 2015, succeeding Billy Eppler.

References

External links

MLB historical statistics

1967 births
Living people
Major League Baseball third basemen
Boston Red Sox players
Pawtucket Red Sox players
Elmira Pioneers players
Winter Haven Red Sox players
Lynchburg Red Sox players
Trenton Thunder players
Miami RedHawks baseball players
Cotuit Kettleers players
New York Yankees scouts
New York Yankees executives
Baseball players from Cincinnati